Heritage is an album by guitarist Kenny Burrell recorded in 1980 and originally released on the AudioSource label.

Reception 

The Allmusic review by Scott Yanow stated: "By 1980 it seemed as if guitarist Kenny Burrell was spending at least as much time looking backwards (paying tribute to the past greats) as he was creating new music. This out-of-print LP from the obscure AudioSource label features Burrell performing nine jazz standards ... A worthwhile if not particularly innovative set".

Track listing 
 "A Night in Tunisia" (Dizzy Gillespie, Frank Paparelli) – 5:50
 "Mood Indigo" (Duke Ellington, Barney Bigard, Irving Mills) – 4:02
 "St. Louis Blues" (W. C. Handy) – 4:23	
 "'Round Midnight" (Thelonious Monk, Cootie Williams, Bernie Hanighen) – 6:11
 "When the Saints Go Marching In" (Traditional) – 4:36
 "Naima" (John Coltrane) – 5:24
 "Struttin' with Some Barbecue" (Lil Hardin, Don Raye) – 4:12	
 "A Child Is Born" (Thad Jones) – 3:20	
 "Lush Life" (Billy Strayhorn) – 5:30

Personnel 
Kenny Burrell – electric guitar, acoustic guitar
Oscar Brashear (tracks 1, 4 & 5), Snooky Young (tracks 2, 3, 7 & 8) – trumpet
Marshall Royal – alto saxophone, clarinet (tracks 2, 3, 6 & 7)
Matt Catingub (track 1), Don Menza (tracks 4 & 5), Jerome Richardson (tracks 2, 3 & 9) – tenor saxophone
Pete Jolly (tracks 2, 3, 6, 7 & 9), Patrice Rushen (tracks 1, 4 & 5) – piano 
Andy Simpkins – bass (tracks 1-7 & 9)
Shelly Manne – drums (tracks 1-7 & 9)
Moacir Santos – percussion (tracks 1, 4 & 5)

References 

Kenny Burrell albums
1980 albums